The Hinh River is a river of Vietnam. It flows through Đắk Lắk Province and Phú Yên Province for 88 kilometres and has a basin area of 1040 km². The river flows through Sông Hinh District ("Hinh River District"). It is a tributary of Đà Rằng River.

References

Rivers of Đắk Lắk province
Rivers of Phú Yên province
Rivers of Vietnam